Haley Jones (born May 23, 2001) is an American college basketball player for the Stanford Cardinal of the Pac-12 Conference. As a sophomore in 2021, she was named an all-conference selection in the Pac-12. The Cardinal won a national championship that season, and Jones was named the Final Four Most Outstanding Player.

Jones was born in Santa Cruz, California. She attended Archbishop Mitty High School in San Jose, where she was named the Naismith Prep Player of the Year and a McDonald's All-American as a senior in 2019. A five-star recruit, Jones was ranked the number one recruit in the 2019 class by ESPN. As a freshman at Stanford University in 2019–20, she averaged 11.4 points, 4.2 rebounds and 2.4 assist before suffering a season-ending, knee ligament injury. The following season in 2020–21 Jones returned to play, averaging 13.2 points, 7.4 rebounds, and 2.8 assists. The Cardinal won the 2021 NCAA tournament for their first national title since 1992.

On April 13, 2021, the Santa Cruz City Council declared that henceforth April 4 will be known as "Haley Jones Day" in recognition of her athletic accomplishments, specifically winning the national championship with Stanford and receiving the NCAA Most Outstanding Player of the Final Four award.

Career statistics

College

|-
| style="text-align:left;"| 2019–20
| style="text-align:left;"| Stanford
| 18 || 13 || 25.8 || .528 || .273 || .627 || 4.2 || 2.4 || 0.8 || 0.9 || 2.7 || 11.4
|-
| style="text-align:left;"| 2020–21
| style="text-align:left;"| Stanford
| 32 || 32 || 27.6 || .546 || .353 || .725 || 7.4 || 2.8 || 0.8 || 0.7 || 2.5 || 13.2
|-
| style="text-align:left;"| 2021–22
| style="text-align:left;"| Stanford
| 33 || 31 || 30.7 || .418 || .244 || .823 || 7.9 || 3.7 || 0.5 || 1.1 || 2.9 || 13.2

She won 1 state champion

References

External links
Stanford Cardinal profile

2001 births
Living people
American women's basketball players
Basketball players from California
Guards (basketball)
McDonald's High School All-Americans
Sportspeople from Santa Cruz, California
Stanford Cardinal women's basketball players
United States women's national basketball team players
All-American college women's basketball players